Marcos Calderón (11 July 1928 – 8 December 1987) was a Peruvian football coach. During his tenure the Selección de fútbol de Perú won the Copa América 1975 and reached the second round of the 1978 World Cup. He was born in Lima in 1928 and died when he was coach to Alianza Lima in a terrible aviation crash that occurred on 8 December 1987 that killed most of the team's promising squad.

Coaching career
Calderon was a football player during the 1950s. A few years after his playing retirement, he began coaching.

Several titles were won during his coaching tenure with significant Peruvian clubs, such as: Universitario de Deportes, Sport Boys, and Sporting Cristal. His successes led to becoming coach of the Selección de fútbol de Perú.

Alianza Lima air disaster

Calderon coached Alianza Lima, developed several significant players and won several titles. Much of the team was relatively young. Calderon had faith in his players, and many of them played on national team. Onboard a plane for an away match of the Peruvian League Alianza Lima, it crashed; Calderon and the entire team Alianza were killed. Several on the team were national team players.

References

1928 births
1987 deaths
Footballers from Lima
Peruvian footballers
Peruvian football managers
1978 FIFA World Cup managers
Club Universitario de Deportes managers
Sport Boys footballers
Sporting Cristal footballers
Sport Boys managers
Club Alianza Lima managers
Sporting Cristal managers
Peru national football team managers
Deportivo Municipal managers
Deportivo Táchira F.C. managers
Expatriate football managers in Venezuela
Victims of aviation accidents or incidents in Peru
1975 Copa América managers
Association football midfielders
Victims of the 1987 Alianza Lima plane crash
Club Carlos Concha players